The 1993 Mid-American Conference men's basketball tournament took place March 11–13, 1993, at Battelle Hall in Columbus, Ohio. Ball State defeated , 79–64 in the championship game, to win its fifth MAC Tournament title.

The Cardinals earned an automatic bid to the 1993 NCAA tournament as #15 seed in the Midwest region. In the round of 64 Ball State fell to Kansas, 94–72.

Format

Bracket

References

1993
Tournament
MAC men's basketball tournament
MAC men's basketball tournament